Frank "Bunch" Davis was a shortstop in the Negro leagues. He played for several different teams, including the Chicago Union Giants, St. Paul Colored Gophers, and Minneapolis Keystones.

References

External links

Further reading
 Hentschell, I. J. (April 18, 1909). "Independent Baseball". Minneapolis Star Tribune. p. 56
 Star Tribune staff (April 16, 1911). "Keystones Off for West Baden". Minneapolis Star Tribune. p. 51
 Star Tribune staff (June 24, 1911). "Keystones to Play Conrads". Minneapolis Star Tribune. p. 19

Chicago American Giants players
Leland Giants players
Minneapolis Keystones players
St. Paul Colored Gophers players
Baseball infielders